WEAG (1490 AM) was a radio station broadcasting a country music format. Formerly licensed to Starke, Florida, United States, the station was owned by Dickerson Broadcasting, Inc.

The owners surrendered the station's license to the Federal Communications Commission (FCC) on December 10, 2012. The FCC cancelled the license and deleted the WEAG call sign from their database on December 17, 2012.

References

External links

EAG
Defunct radio stations in the United States
Radio stations established in 1957
Radio stations disestablished in 2012
1957 establishments in Florida
2012 disestablishments in Florida
EAG